Magic City Part 2 is the fourth solo album by MC Magic.

Track listing

References

2008 albums
MC Magic albums
Sequel albums